is a Japanese politician and member of the House of Representatives for Japanese Communist Party.

A native of Kyoto, and graduate of Kyoto University, he was elected to the first of his three terms in the city assembly of Sakai, Osaka in 1971 and then to his one term in the assembly of Osaka Prefecture in 1983. After running unsuccessfully for the House of Councillors in 1986, he was elected to the house in 1988 but lost his seat in the following year. In 1990 he was elected to the House of Representatives for the first time.

References

External links
 Official website in Japanese.

1942 births
Living people
Members of the House of Representatives (Japan)
Japanese Communist Party politicians
People from Kyoto
21st-century Japanese politicians